John Markovski (born 15 April 1970) is an Australian soccer coach and former player, current head coach of Altona Magic. Markovski played in the National Soccer League (NSL) for Sunshine George Cross, Preston Lions (former Preston Makedonia), Morwell Falcons, Canberra Cosmos, Auckland Kingz, Carlton SC, Melbourne Knights and Perth Glory FC and was known Australia-wide for his excellent free kick taking skills. Markovski soon retired from playing football after his daughter Zara Markovski was born. Markovski has three children named Zara, Joshua and Jonas. He  now watches them proudly play the sport he once used to.

Playing career

Club career
Markovski made his debut as a second-half substitute for Sunshine George Cross in round one of the 1986 National Soccer League season at the age of 15.

Ahead of the 1989 National Soccer League season, Markovski signed for Preston Makedonia.

International career
Markovski represented the Australia national soccer team on 19 occasions for one goal and represented Australia at under 20 and 23 level at the Barcelona Olympics in 1992 and at the World Youth Cup in 1987.

Coaching career
Markovski began his coaching career while still playing, taking charge of Preston Lions midway through the 2002 Victorian Premier League season. Markovski was coach at Sydenham Park SC in Victorian State League 1 in 2017 and 2018. Also became the head coach at Springvale White Eagles in 2020 and head coach for Altona Magic in 2012, 2021 and 2023.

Career statistics

Club

Ref.

International

|}

References

External links
 Veteran aims to kick-start Kingz 

1970 births
Living people
Australian people of Macedonian descent
Australian soccer players
Australia international soccer players
Olympic soccer players of Australia
National Soccer League (Australia) players
Canberra Cosmos FC players
Carlton S.C. players
Football Kingz F.C. players
Gippsland Falcons players
Marconi Stallions FC players
Melbourne Knights FC players
Perth Glory FC players
Caroline Springs George Cross FC players
Preston Lions FC players
Preston Lions FC managers
Association football forwards
Australian soccer coaches
Australian Macedonian soccer managers
Footballers at the 1992 Summer Olympics
1996 OFC Nations Cup players
People from Sunshine, Victoria
Soccer players from Melbourne